Merchas Ghazi Salih Doski (born 7 December 1999) is a professional footballer who plays as a left-back for Slovácko and the Iraq national team.

Club career
Born in Hanover, Doski grew up in the district of Vahrenheide. He played youth football with Arminia Hannover and Germania Egestorf/Langreder. Having established himself at Landesliga club Heeßeler SV he earned a move to MTV Eintracht Celle of the fifth-tier Oberliga.

In July 2020, after trialling at the club, Doski signed with Austrian side Wacker Innsbruck. He scored his first goal for the club's first team in November, in a 3–2 win against SV Horn in the Austrian 2. Liga. He agreed a new contract until 2023 with Wacker Innsbruck in December. His first-team game time was limited but he played in a friendly against Liverpool in the summer of 2021. In May 2022 he terminated his contract at Wacker Innsbruck after the club had failed to pay the salaries of players.

After starring in the 2022 AFC U-23 Asian Cup in Uzbekistan, he went on trial at FC Slovacko and later earned the move to the Czech Cup winners, where he established himself as a first team regular.

International career
Also eligible to represent Germany, Doski was invited to the Iraqi Olympic team camp in January 2022, and was one of five Iraqi players based abroad that were later selected for the 2022 Dubai Cup in March. He made his debut against Vietnam and went on to play against Saudi Arabia and Thailand too.

He played in both warm-up matches against Iran before being selected for the 2022 AFC U-23 Asian Cup in Uzbekistan. He was one of the standing out players of Iraq during the tournament, scoring in the penalty shoot-out against Uzbekistan.

On 25 August 2022, Doski was called up for the first time to the first team to play in the 2022 Jordan International Tournament.

Personal life
Merchas was born in Germany to parents who are from Zakho in northern Iraq.

References

External links
 Forza Football Profile

1999 births
Living people
Footballers from Hanover
Iraqi footballers
Iraq international footballers
German footballers
German people of Iraqi descent
Association football defenders
2. Liga (Austria) players
Austrian Regionalliga players
Czech First League players
FC Wacker Innsbruck (2002) players
1. FC Slovácko players
Iraqi expatriate footballers
German expatriate footballers
German expatriate sportspeople in Austria
German expatriate sportspeople in the Czech Republic
Iraqi expatriate sportspeople in Austria
Expatriate footballers in Austria
Iraqi expatriate sportspeople in the Czech Republic
Expatriate footballers in the Czech Republic